San Pedro District is one of ten districts of the Ocros Province in Peru.

References

Districts of the Ocros Province
Districts of the Ancash Region